The 2002 Vaahteraliiga season was the 23rd season of the highest level of American football in Finland. The regular season took place between June 1 and August 12, 2002. The Finnish champion was determined in the playoffs and at the championship game Vaahteramalja XXIII the Helsinki Roosters won the Turku Trojans.

Standings

Playoffs

References 

American football in Finland
Vaahteraliiga
Vaahteraliiga